Alexander Clay may refer to:
 Alexander S. Clay (1853–1910), United States Senator from Georgia
 SS Alexander S. Clay, a 1944 Liberty ship
 Alexander Clay (rugby union) (1863–1950), Scottish rugby union player
 Alex Clay (born 1992), American professional soccer player